Oliver is one of the oldest residential neighbourhoods in the City of Edmonton, Alberta, Canada.  The neighbourhood is named after Frank Oliver, an early Edmonton resident, businessman, and politician.  The south east portion of the neighbourhood is also known as Grandin, with both Grandin station (now known as Government Centre station and Grandin School located in this part of the neighbourhood.

Oliver is located immediately to the west of the downtown core, and overlooks the North Saskatchewan River valley south of the neighbourhood. Located in the river valley immediately below Oliver is Edmonton's Royal Glenora Club, Victoria Golf Course, and Victoria Park. The High Level Bridge and Groat Bridge give residents access to the south side of the river valley, including the University of Alberta and Old Strathcona. The Victoria Promenade (part of Edmonton's Heritage Trail) offers attractive vistas of the river valley at the western end of Oliver.

Oliver is one of the densest neighbourhoods in Edmonton and West Oliver is the densest area in Alberta. The population in 2009 was 18,203, the highest of every neighbourhood in Edmonton.

The north edge of the neighbourhood was once a Canadian National Railway right of way and rail yard.  This part of the neighbourhood was recently redeveloped, and includes apartment buildings, the Unity Square and Unity Square West strip shopping centres, some old warehouses converted shops, and parking for the MacEwan University downtown campus.

The community is represented by the Oliver Community League, established in 1922.

Demographics 

Residential development 

Oliver was early Edmonton's West End.  As the city grew, Oliver became a central neighbourhood and underwent a significant amount of redevelopment.  According to the 2001 federal census, most of the residences in Oliver were built in the 1960s and later, with only one residence in seven (14.5%) dating from 1960 and earlier.  These buildings represent surviving structures from Oliver's early development.

Beginning in the 1960s, the neighbourhood underwent significant redevelopment with a significant number of high-rise apartments/condos coming to dominate the neighbourhood's skyline.  Approximately one residence in three (30.4%) were built between 1961 and 1970. Another one residence in three (31.9%) were built between 1971 and 1980. One residence in seven (13.7%) were built during the early 1980s. While some redevelopment occurred after 1985, the pace of redevelopment slowed significantly.

The most common type of residence in Oliver, according to the 2005 municipal census, are rented apartments and apartment style condominiums in high-rise buildings with more than five stories.  This type of residence accounts for roughly two out of every three (66%) residences in the neighbourhood.  Approximately seven out of every ten of these are rented.

Most of the remaining residences are rented apartments and apartment style condominiums in low-rise buildings with fewer than five stories.  This type of residence accounts for approximately one out of three (31%) of all residences in Oliver.  Approximately four out of five buildings are rented.

In addition, there are a small number of duplexes, row houses, and single-family dwellings.

Population mobility 
The population in Oliver is comparatively mobile.  According to the 2014 municipal census, almost two out of every ten (17.1%) residents had moved within the previous twelve months.  Another one in five (18.1%) residents had moved within the previous one to three years. About one resident in four (28.1%) had lived at the same address for at least five years.

Shopping and services 
There is a significant amount of commercial development in the Oliver area.

During the 1990s and early 2000s, the majority of the rail yards of the Canadian National and Canadian Pacific railways were redeveloped as strip shopping centres.  These include Unity Square and Unity Square West located along the north edge of Oliver.  In addition, a Canadian Pacific rail yard, immediately to the east of Oliver, was also redeveloped as a strip shopping centre.

Edmonton's main street, Jasper Avenue, cuts through Oliver, and much of Jasper Avenue is lined with shops, restaurants and other services.

Along the west edge of the neighbourhood, shops and businesses line 124 Street. Just to the west of Oliver, in the neighbourhood of Westmount, are the shops and services located in another strip shopping centre called High Street.

Religious assemblies 

There are many places of worship in the Oliver area. One of the best known is St. Joseph's Basilica.  Originally St. Joseph's Cathedral, the name was changed when Pope John Paul II visited Edmonton during his visit to Canada in 1984.

Other places of worship in Oliver are:
 Beth Shalom Synagogue
 Christ Church (Anglican)
 Ethiopian Evangelical Church
 Evangelical Mission to Ukraine
 Grace Lutheran
 House of Refuge Mission
 Jesus is Lord Fellowship
 The Oblate Missionaries Secular Institute
 Robertson Wesley United Church, and
 St. Joachim Church.

The Beth Israel Synagogue was also located in the Oliver area before relocating to the Oleskiw neighbourhood.

Surrounding neighbourhoods 
Surrounding neighbourhoods include Queen Mary Park to the north, Central McDougall to the north east, and Westmount to the west and north west.  It is bounded on the west by 124 Street, on the north by 105 Ave, and on the east by 110 Street.

See also 
 Edmonton Federation of Community Leagues

References

Further reading 
 

Neighbourhoods in Edmonton